Andrew Kabila Mbeba (born 19 February 2000) is a Zimbabwean footballer who plays as a defender for Highlanders, and the Zimbabwe national football team.

Club career
Mbeba is a product of the Highlanders academy, and won the Zimbabwe Premier Soccer League's Rookie of the Year award for the 2019 season.

International career
Having captained the Zimbabwe national under-20 team at the 2018 COSAFA U-20 Cup in which they finished as runners-up, he made his senior international debut on 24 January 2021 in a 1–0 defeat to Mali in the 2020 African Nations Championship.

Honours
Zimbabwe U20
COSAFA U-20 Cup: 2018

References

External links
 
 

Living people
2000 births
Zimbabwean footballers
Association football defenders
Highlanders F.C. players
Zimbabwe international footballers
Zimbabwe Premier Soccer League players
Zimbabwe A' international footballers
2020 African Nations Championship players